Jerolim Zagurović (()) ( 1550—1580) was a Serbian-Venetian printer of Serbian Cyrillic books (srbulje). Zagurović and Vićenco Vuković were the last printers of srbulje books.

Family 

Zagurović was Serbian Catholic and member of the noble Zagurović family from Kotor, Republic of Venice (today Montenegro). His paternal uncle was distinguished poet Ilija Zagurović.

The Zagurović family was related to the Serbian Crnojević family through the marriage of Jerolim Zagurović and Antonija Crnojević, the daughter of Lord Đurađ Crnojević of Zeta (r. 1489–96). They had a son, Anđelo, who lived in Venice.

Printing 

The Crnojević printing house was disestablished when Đurađ Crnojević fled Zeta in 1496. The types used in his printing house remained in the monastery until Jerolim Zagurović found them somewhere before 1569. He wrote that he took some types to Venice. Because Jerolim insisted he brought types from Crnojević printing house to Venice, it was speculated that he had actually used Crnojević's types in his printing house. This was disputed by some later works which explained that the Crnojević printing house was so well reputed that other printing houses imitated its types.

In 1569 he founded a printing house in Venice and began printing Cyrillic books. One of the motives of Jerolim Zagurović to establish the printing house was to earn some profit from it to compensate losses of the Zagurović family business caused by frequent Ottoman sieges of Kotor. Zagurović did not have a formal theological education so he had to engage Jakov of Kamena Reka to edit and proofread the texts before printing. (Jakov belonged to the Serbian Orthodox Church).

In 1569 he printed a psalter and in 1570 a prayer book. This was the last Serbian Cyrillic book printed until the second half of the 18th century. There was only one book printed in 1638 in Venice by Bartholomew Ginami, but it was simply a reprint of the psalter with the book of hours published by Zagurović in 1569.  Zagurović's printing press was firstly taken over by Jakov of Kamena Reka, and then in 1597 by Bartolomeo Ginammi who used it until 1638.

See also
Božidar Vuković
Božidar Goraždanin
Đurađ Crnojević
Stefan Marinović
Hieromonk Makarije
Hieromonk Mardarije
Hegumen Mardarije
Vićenco Vuković
Hieromonk Pahomije
Trojan Gundulić
Andrija Paltašić
Jakov of Kamena Reka
Bartolomeo Ginammi who followed Jerolim Zagurović's footsteps reprinting Serbian books.
Dimitrije Ljubavić
Teodor Račanin

References

Sources

Further reading
 

1550 births
1580 deaths
16th-century printers
16th-century Serbian people
Serbian printers
Serbs of Montenegro
Republic of Venice printers
Venetian period in the history of Montenegro
People from Kotor
Venetian Slavs
16th-century Roman Catholics
Serbian Roman Catholics
16th-century Italian businesspeople